Leonardo Moura may refer to:

Leonardo da Silva Moura (born 1978), Brazilian footballer
Leonardo David de Moura (born 1983), Brazilian footballer
Leonardo José Aparecido Moura (born 1986), Brazilian footballer
 Leonardo de Moura, a researcher at Microsoft Research who wrote Z3 and Lean

See also
 Moura (surname)